Oswaldo Novoa Mora (born on 2 February 1982) is a Mexican professional boxer who held the WBC strawweight title in 2014.

Professional career
On October 5, 2012, Novoa defeated Jose Alfredo Zuniga by twelfth round unanimous decision to win the WBC FECOMBOX Light Flyweight title.

Novoa won his first world title when he defeated Xiong Zhao Zhong by fifth round knockout to win the WBC Minimumweight title on February 5, 2014.

Professional boxing record

See also
List of world mini-flyweight boxing champions
List of Mexican boxing world champions

References

External links

1982 births
Living people
Mexican male boxers
Boxers from Jalisco
Sportspeople from Guadalajara, Jalisco
Mini-flyweight boxers
Light-flyweight boxers
Flyweight boxers
World mini-flyweight boxing champions
World Boxing Council champions